Faruj (also Romanized as Fārūj; also known as Fārij) is a city and capital of Faruj County, in North Khorasan Province, Iran. At the 2016 census, its population was 18,061, in 2,639 families.

History 
This city was formerly called Farajabad. It is said that about 1200 years ago, during the time of Harun al-Rasheed, Farooj was built by a person named Farjullah. This area is located between the two cities of Quchan and Shirvan in the west of the province. The main language of the Farooj people is Persian and Turkish Khorasani and Kurdish is also spoken in Kermanji. the Farooj Turks are from the Mehani tribe and the Farooj Kurds are from the Zafranlu tribe.

One of the best factors in attracting tourists and travelers to Farooj is the presence of various nuts and various foods in this area. The existence of the Road 22 (Iran) and its passage through the city center caused the city of Farooj to be named as the capital of nuts and dried fruits of Iran since 2010. a city that has lasted until now and its quality and power are increasing day by day.

Geography

Location 
Farooj is bordered by Quchan city from the east, Turkmenistan from the north, Esfarayen city from the south, and Shirvan city from the west.

Saffron or Farouj red gold 
Today, with a good amount of saffron production in Farouj, there is a capacity to provide more grounds for the development of the city by turning Farouj saffron into a national and even global brand. Currently, most of the production of saffron and other nuts is exported to Mashhad for sale to tourists. With the arrival of processing and packaging companies in the city in recent years, fortunately, great job opportunities are provided for the people of this city.

References 

Populated places in Faruj County

Cities in North Khorasan Province